Central Hotel and A. Bube's Brewery, are a historic hotel and brewery complex located at Mount Joy, Lancaster County, Pennsylvania. The brewery building was built in 1859, and consists of a 2 1/2-story, stone flat roofed building with a one-story, attached brick building. The stone portion features large, arched double entry doors.  In 1880, Alois Bube built the Central Hotel.  It is a three-story, flat roofed building with a wide overhanging cornice and elaborate decoration in the Late Victorian style.  The original third-floor had a mansard roof, but it was destroyed by fire in 1893, and replaced with the present configuration.  The two buildings are connected by a three-story ice house.

It was listed on the National Register of Historic Places on June 4, 1973.

On April 25, 2012, the complex was featured in an episode of Ghost Hunters on Syfy.

See also
 Contributing property
 Cultural landscape
 Historic preservation
 Keeper of the Register
 List of heritage registers
 Property type (National Register of Historic Places)
 United States National Register of Historic Places listings
 State Historic Preservation Office

References

External links
Bube's Brewery website
National Register of Historic Places

Industrial buildings and structures on the National Register of Historic Places in Pennsylvania
Hotel buildings on the National Register of Historic Places in Pennsylvania
Industrial buildings completed in 1859
Hotel buildings completed in 1880
Buildings and structures in Lancaster County, Pennsylvania
1880 establishments in Pennsylvania
National Register of Historic Places in Lancaster County, Pennsylvania